Sonya Apa Temata is a takataapui human rights activist and nurse of Cook Islander, Māori and Tahitian descent. She specialises in advocacy for the LGBT+ community in Oceania. She has spoken out about how the criminalisation of gay men is a legacy of British colonialism in the Pacific. 

In 2020 Temata organised a petition in support of the decriminalisation of homosexuality in the Cooks Islands, which was presented by the Te Tiare Association to the Government of the Cook Islands, who were considering repealing the law. 

Temata is a former board member of Auckland Pride.

Awards 

 Winner - Pacific Health Volunteer Individual Awards (2018)

References

External links 

 PSD 2019 - Sonya Apa Temata (interview)
 Framing Cook Islands Indigenous Epistemologies (slide-deck by Temata)

New Zealand LGBT rights activists
Cook Island Māori people
Cook Island activists
Living people
Year of birth missing (living people)
New Zealand nurses